The Final Word may refer to:

The Final Word (novel), by Zlatko Topčić
"The Final Word", a former USA Today column by Craig Wilson
The Final Word, a 1987 album by Michael Card
The FinalWord, later Sprint (word processor)

See also
The Last Word (disambiguation)